The Republic of China (Taiwan) has submitted films for the Academy Award for Best International Feature Film since 1957, and regularly since 1980. The award is handed out annually by the United States Academy of Motion Picture Arts and Sciences to a feature-length motion picture produced outside the United States that contains primarily non-English dialogue. It was not created until the 1956 Academy Awards, in which a competitive Academy Award of Merit, known as the Best Foreign Language Film Award, was created for non-English speaking films, and has been given annually since.

For the purposes of Oscar submissions, AMPAS recognizes Mainland China, Taiwan and Hong Kong as separate entities, and each one regularly submits a film to the competition. Taiwan became the first of the three ethnic Chinese entities to enter the competition in 1957.

To date, Taiwan has submitted forty-seven films for Oscar consideration. Three Taiwanese films have been nominated for the Academy Award for Best Foreign Language Film, and all three nominated films were directed by Ang Lee: The Wedding Banquet, Eat Drink Man Woman, and Crouching Tiger, Hidden Dragon, which is the only Taiwanese film to have won the Academy Award for Best Foreign Language Film. Taiwan initially selected Ang Lee's Lust, Caution in 2007, but AMPAS did not accept the film saying that was not a majority-Taiwanese production. Directors Chen Kunhou and Hou Hsiao-hsien have each had three films selected to represent Taiwan, but none received an Oscar nomination.

Submissions
The Academy of Motion Picture Arts and Sciences has invited the film industries of various countries to submit their best film for the Academy Award for Best Foreign Language Film since 1956. The Foreign Language Film Award Committee oversees the process and reviews all the submitted films. Following this, they vote via secret ballot to determine the five nominees for the award. Below is a list of the films that have been submitted by Taiwan for review by the Academy for the award by year and the respective Academy Awards ceremony.

See also
 Cinema of Taiwan
 List of Taiwanese films
 List of Academy Award-winning foreign language films
 List of Academy Award winners and nominees for Best Foreign Language Film
List of Chinese submissions for the Academy Award for Best International Feature Film
List of Hong Kong submissions for the Academy Award for Best International Feature Film

Notes

References

External links
 The Official Academy Awards Database
 The Motion Picture Credits Database
 IMDb Academy Awards Page

Taiwan
Lists of Taiwanese films